was Japanese samurai warrior of the Sengoku Period. He is known as one of the "Twenty-Four Generals of Takeda Shingen" 

He also recorded as having been wounded 41 times in 36 encounters. 
He was the father of Obata Masamori.

See also
 Isao Obata

References

External links 
  "Legendary Takeda's 24 Generals" at Yamanashi-kankou.jp

Takeda retainers
Samurai
1491 births
1561 deaths